Vlatko Andonovski (born 14 September 1976) is a Macedonian-American soccer coach and former player. He is currently the head coach of the United States women's national team.

Andonovski previously coached FC Kansas City and Reign FC of the National Women's Soccer League, as well as the Kansas City Comets in the Major Arena Soccer League.

Playing career
A central defender, Andonovski played six seasons for multiple clubs in Europe, such as FK Rabotnički, Makedonija GP and FK Vardar, competing in the First Macedonian Football League, European Cup and Intertoto Cup.

In 2000, Andonovski signed with the Wichita Wings of the National Professional Soccer League and later played for the Kansas City Comets, California Cougars and Philadelphia Kixx of the Major Indoor Soccer League in his indoor career.

On 8 February 2015, Andonovski and Wichita coach Kim Røntved came out of retirement to play against each other for their respective teams for one game.

Managerial career
On 5 December 2012, Andonovski signed a contract to become the head coach of FC Kansas City. He was hired as the head coach of Kansas City Comets on 29 August 2013, after being an assistant under Kim Røntved for three seasons. During the 2014 year of both programs, Andonovski won both the MISL Championship with the Comets and the NWSL Championship with FC Kansas City.

On 7 November 2017, Andonovski moved to Seattle Reign FC, succeeding Laura Harvey as head coach. During his tenure with the team, it moved from Seattle to Tacoma, Washington after the 2018 season and rebranded itself as Reign FC; it would rebrand again in 2020 as OL Reign.

Andonovski holds a USSF Pro License and a United Soccer Coaches (formerly NSCAA) Goalkeeping Diploma and has been involved with many youth teams and clubs in the Kansas City area.

Andonovski received significant praise from media and players alike for his role in the Reign's 2019 season. Despite losing a significant number of players to various injuries and the 2019 FIFA Women's World Cup, Andonovski managed the team to a 4th place finish in the NWSL and a second straight playoff berth.

Andonovski was named the head coach of the United States women's national soccer team on 28 October 2019.

Personal life
Andonovski was born in Skopje, SR Macedonia, SFR Yugoslavia (now North Macedonia), and became a U.S. citizen in 2015. He is a 2008 graduate of Park University with a Bachelor of Arts degree in Business Administration/Management. He earned a Sports Science Masters Degree (MSC) in Coaching Soccer from Ohio University in 2017. Andonovski resides in Kansas City, Missouri, with his wife, Biljana, and their three children Dragana, Luka, and Daria.

Managerial statistics

Honors

Playing
Individual
 MISL Most Valuable Player: 2005
 MISL Defender of the Year: 2002
 MISL Most Improved Player: 2002
 MISL All-Star: 2-time

Coaching
High School / Youth
 Missouri State Championship: 4-time
 Youth National Championship: 1-time

Kansas City Comets
Major Indoor Soccer League: 2013–14

FC Kansas City
 NWSL Championship: 2014, 2015

United States

 CONCACAF Women's Championship: 2022

 Olympic Bronze Medal: 2020

SheBelieves Cup: 2020, 2021, 2022, 2023

Individual
Major Arena Soccer League Coach of the Year: 2014-15
 NWSL Coach of the Year: 2013, 2019

References

External links
 LinkedIn profile
 FC Kansas City profile 
 
 

1976 births
Living people
Footballers from Skopje
Macedonian footballers
Macedonian football managers
Macedonian expatriate footballers
Macedonian expatriate football managers
Macedonian expatriate sportspeople in the United States
FK Makedonija Gjorče Petrov players
Wichita Wings players
Missouri Comets players
Indoor soccer players
Major Arena Soccer League players
Player-coaches
National Women's Soccer League coaches
FC Kansas City coaches
OL Reign coaches
Major Arena Soccer League coaches
American soccer players
American soccer coaches
North Macedonia emigrants to the United States
Naturalized citizens of the United States
American women's soccer coaches
United States women's national soccer team managers
American people of Macedonian descent
Association football defenders
Park University alumni
Ohio University alumni